François Pache (born 1 June 1932) is a Swiss figure skater. He is a six-time (1951–1952, 1954, 1956, 1958, 1962) Swiss national champion. He represented Switzerland at the 1952 Winter Olympics and at the 1956 Winter Olympics. He placed 9th in the men's event in 1952 and 11th in 1956.

Competitive highlights

References

 
 List of Historical Swiss Champions

External links

Swiss male single skaters
Olympic figure skaters of Switzerland
Figure skaters at the 1956 Winter Olympics
Figure skaters at the 1952 Winter Olympics
1932 births
Possibly living people